The Giles G-202 is an unlimited-level aerobatic airplane designed by Richard Giles.

This carbon fiber composite monoplane was manufactured by AkroTech Aviation in Troutdale, Oregon. The tandem two-seater was based upon the single-seater Giles G-200.

The G-202 was produced and sold as kit plane by AkroTech, and slightly modified as the CAP 222 by Avions Mudry (France).

Operational history
In 1999 airshow performer Wayne Handley broke the world record for the most consecutive flat spins in a Giles G-202 performing 78 spins. The record was broken in 2014 by Spencer Suderman in 2014 in a Pitts S2-B performing 81 spins from 23,000 ft altitude.
A Giles 202 crashed on Friday 28 August 2015 during practice for an air show at Stewart International Airport near New Windsor, NY, about 60 miles north of New York City. Photos taken by a bystander show the tail separating from the aircraft as the pilot was in an ascending manoeuver. The pilot was killed.
A Giles 202 crashed on Thursday 30 May 2019 during takeoff at the Wasilla Airport near Wasilla, AK.  The pilot was killed.  NTSB is still investigating the crash. 
A Giles 202 crashed on Saturday 29 October 2022 during a normal flight near Ulm, Germany. Two occupants died.

Specifications (G-202)

References

External links

G-202
Single-engined tractor aircraft
Low-wing aircraft
1990s United States sport aircraft
Homebuilt aircraft
Aerobatic aircraft
Conventional landing gear